Urban Legend is an American horror film franchise consisting of three slasher films. The first installment was written by Silvio Horta, directed by Jamie Blanks, and released in 1998.

Films

Urban Legend (1998)

A college student suspects a series of bizarre deaths are connected to certain urban legends.

Urban Legends: Final Cut (2000)

A film school is the center of a fresh spate of killings based on urban legends.

Urban Legends: Bloody Mary (2005)

On a prom-night dare, a trio of high school friends chant an incantation, unleashing an evil spirit from the past with deadly consequences.

Future
In February 2020, a reboot was announced to be in development, to be written and directed by Colin Minihan. In August, Sydney Chandler, Katherine McNamara and Keith Powers were cast in the film.

Cast and crew
 A  indicates the actor or actress lent only his or her voice for his or her film character.
 A  indicates the actor portrayed the role of a younger version of the character.
 A  indicates a cameo appearance.
 A dark gray cell indicates the character was not in the film.

Principal cast

Additional crew

Reception

Box office performance

Critical and public response

References

Slasher film series
Film series introduced in 1998
Sony Pictures franchises